John Lindsay Lucas (1807–1874) was an English portrait painter.

Life
Born in London on 4 July 1807, he was son of William Lucas, from a King's Lynn family, originally in the Royal Navy, then a writer and journalist; his mother was a Miss Callcott. He was apprenticed to Samuel William Reynolds, the mezzotint engraver, where Samuel Cousins was his fellow-pupil. At the end of his apprenticeship he set up as a portrait-painter.

Lucas was a member of the Clipstone Street academy, where he worked with William Etty and other artists. One of his earliest patrons and sitters was Henry Milton, who introduced him to Mary Russell Mitford, whose portrait he painted, and exhibited at the Royal Academy in 1829. He then substituted a portrait of her father. A further portrait of her, he kept in his studio, and it was purchased after his death for the National Portrait Gallery.

One of the fashionable portrait-painters of his time, Lucas had a successful career. He died at his residence in St John's Wood, London, on 30 April 1874. Works in his possession at his death went to auction by Messrs. Christie, Manson, & Wood's, on 25 February 1875.

Works

Lucas exhibited 96 portraits at the Royal Academy, 13 at the British Institution, and eight at the Suffolk Street Gallery, between 1828 and his death. Those sat who sat for him included Queen Adelaide, Albert, Prince Consort (four times), the Princess Royal, the Duke of Wellington (eight times), Lord and Lady Palmerston, William Ewart Gladstone, Lord and Lady Mahon, and many court beauties. He contributed to Sir Robert Peel's gallery of contemporary portraits. 
 
Many of Lucas's portraits were engraved, some, like that of Nicholas Conyngham Tindal, by himself in mezzotint. He also engraved a few portraits after Sir Thomas Lawrence, including one of the Queen of Portugal.

Family
Lucas married early in life Miss Milborough Morgan, and left three sons and two daughters. The eldest son, John Templeton Lucas (1836–1880), was an artist; William Lucas became a water-colour painter; and Arthur Lucas became an art publisher in New Bond Street, London. John Seymour Lucas was a nephew and pupil.

Notes

External links

 
Attribution
 

 

English portrait painters
English engravers
1807 births
1874 deaths
English male painters
Burials at Kensal Green Cemetery
Portrait engravers
19th-century English painters
19th-century English male artists